Since Montana became a U.S. state in 1889, it has sent congressional delegations to the United States Senate and the United States House of Representatives. Each state elects two senators to serve for six years. Before the Seventeenth Amendment took effect in 1913, senators were elected by the Montana State Legislature. Members of the House of Representatives are elected to two-year terms, one from Montana's at-large congressional district. Before becoming a state, the Territory of Montana elected a non-voting delegate at-large to Congress from 1864 to 1889.

A total of 54 people have served either the Territory or State of Montana: 17 in the Senate, 32 in the House, and five in both houses. The longest-serving senator is Max Baucus, in office from 1978 to 2014. The longest-serving representative is Pat Williams, in office for 18 years from 1979 to 1997. One woman has been a member of Montana's congressional delegation, Jeannette Rankin, as a representative. She was the first woman in the United States Congress.

The current dean of the Montana delegation is Senator Jon Tester, having served in the Senate since 2007.

United States Senate

Each state elects two senators by statewide popular vote every six years. The terms of the two senators are staggered so that they are not elected in the same year. Montana's senators are elected in the years from classes I and II. Senators were originally chosen by the Montana House of Representatives until the Seventeenth Amendment came into force in 1913.

There have been twenty-two senators elected from Montana, of whom fourteen have been Democrats and eight have been Republicans. Montana's current senators are Democrat Jon Tester, in office since 2007, and Republican Steve Daines, in office since 2015. Tester was re-elected in 2012 with 48.58% of the vote, and Daines was elected in 2014 with 57.9% of the vote.

U.S. House of Representatives

Current representatives

Delegates from Montana Territory

The Territory of Montana was an organized incorporated territory of the United States formed on May 26, 1864. The territory initially consisted of present-day Montana. The boundaries of the territory did not change during its existence.

The territorial delegates were elected to two-year terms. Delegates were allowed to serve on committees, debate, and submit legislation, but were not permitted to vote on bills. Delegates only served in the House of Representatives as there was no representation in the Senate until Montana became a state.

Members of the United States House of Representatives 
Members of the House of Representatives are elected every two years by popular vote within a congressional district. Montana currently has two congressional districts. Every ten years, the number of congressional districts is reapportioned based on the state's population as determined by the United States census; Montana had had two districts from 1913 to 1993 and one at-large district from 1993 to 2023.

There have been 34 people, including just one woman, who have served as representatives from Montana: 15 Democrats, 18 Republicans and 1 Populist. Ryan Zinke and Matt Rosendale are the current officeholders.

Key

See also

List of United States congressional districts
Montana's congressional districts
Political party strength in Montana

References

Politics of Montana
Montana
 
 
Congressional Delegations